Kerivoulinae is a subfamily of vesper bats. There are 25 species in 2 genera within this subfamily:

Subfamily Kerivoulinae
Genus Kerivoula - Painted bats
 Tanzanian woolly bat (Kerivoula africana)
 St. Aignan's trumpet-eared bat (Kerivoula agnella)
 Damara woolly bat (Kerivoula argentata)
 Cryptic woolly bat, Kerivoula crypta
 Copper woolly bat (Kerivoula cuprosa)
 Flat-skulled woolly bat, Kerivoula depressa
 Indochinese woolly bat, Kerivoula dongduongana
 Ethiopian woolly bat (Kerivoula eriophora)
 Flores woolly bat (Kerivoula flora)
 Dark woolly bat (Kerivoula furva)
 Hardwicke's woolly bat (Kerivoula hardwickii)
 Small woolly bat (Kerivoula intermedia)
 Kachin woolly bat (Kerivoula kachinensis)
 Krau woolly bat (Kerivoula krauensis)
 Lesser woolly bat (Kerivoula lanosa)
 Lenis woolly bat (Kerivoula lenis)
 Sri Lankan woolly bat (Kerivoula malpasi)
 Least woolly bat (Kerivoula minuta)
 Fly River trumpet-eared bat (Kerivoula muscina)
 Bismarck's trumpet-eared bat (Kerivoula myrella)
 Papillose woolly bat (Kerivoula papillosa)
 Clear-winged woolly bat (Kerivoula pellucida)
 Spurrell's woolly bat (Kerivoula phalaena)
 Painted bat (Kerivoula picta)
 Bornean woolly bat (K. pusilla)
 Smith's woolly bat (Kerivoula smithii)
 Titania's woolly bat (Kerivoula titania)
 Whitehead's woolly bat (Kerivoula whiteheadi)
Genus Phoniscus
Dubious trumpet-eared bat, Phoniscus aerosa
Groove-toothed bat, Phoniscus atrox
Peters's trumpet-eared bat, Phoniscus jagorii
Golden-tipped bat, Phoniscus papuensis

References

 
Mammal subfamilies
Taxa named by Gerrit Smith Miller Jr.